Tirot Sing Memorial College, established in 1987, is a general degree college situated at Mairang, in Meghalaya. This college is affiliated with the North Eastern Hill University. This college offers bachelor's degree in arts.

The college is named after Tirot Sing, a Khasi chief and freedom fighter who fought against the British from 1829 to 1833.

References

External links
http://tirotsingmemorialcollege.in

Universities and colleges in Meghalaya
Colleges affiliated to North-Eastern Hill University
Educational institutions established in 1987
1987 establishments in Meghalaya